Arthur Godfrey Kilner Brown (21 February 1915 – 4 February 1995) was a British athlete, winner of a gold medal in the  at the 1936 Summer Olympics. He later became Headmaster of the Royal Grammar School Worcester, a post which he held from 1950 until his retirement in 1978.

At the Berlin Olympics, Brown was narrowly beaten by Archie Williams in the 400 m individual event, but Brown anchored the British 4 × 400 m relay team to a gold medal ahead of the United States.

In 1937, Brown won 400 m at the World Student Games, with additional gold medals at both relays.

At the 1938 European Championships, Brown won the individual 400 m, anchored the British 4 × 400 m relay team to a second place and won the bronze at 4 × 100 m relay.

Brown was educated at Warwick School, where he was Head Boy from 1933 – 1934. In 1935 he went to study English and History at Peterhouse, Cambridge University and worked after graduation as a history master at Bedford School. Because his sight was poor he was not mobilized in the Army, staying as school master at Cheltenham College from 1943 to 1950. From 1950 till 1978, Brown was the headmaster of Worcester Royal Grammar School. He died in Sussex, aged 79.

His sister Audrey and brother Ralph were also notable athletes, Audrey winning a silver in 4 × 100 m relay at the 1936 Olympics and Ralph won the British AAA championships title in  hurdles in 1934.

References

1915 births
1995 deaths
People from Bankura
British male sprinters
Athletes (track and field) at the 1936 Summer Olympics
Olympic athletes of Great Britain
Olympic gold medallists for Great Britain
Olympic silver medallists for Great Britain
People educated at Warwick School
European Athletics Championships medalists
Medalists at the 1936 Summer Olympics
Olympic gold medalists in athletics (track and field)
Olympic silver medalists in athletics (track and field)
Schoolteachers from Worcestershire
Heads of schools in England
Teachers at Royal Grammar School Worcester